The Hofstra Pride men's lacrosse team represents Hofstra University in the CAA in the National Collegiate Athletic Association (NCAA) Division I men's lacrosse competition.  They play at James M. Shuart Stadium in Hempstead, New York.

History
Hofstra fielded its first varsity men's lacrosse team in 1949, hiring Howdy Myers the following season from Johns Hopkins to take over the program. Myers had previously won three national titles with Hopkins.

Myers quickly got the program to a high level, where in 1955 Hofstra was 14 and 2, and ranked 3rd in the country. Hofstra defeated Rutgers that season 16-6, to win the Division II national title, Laurie Cox Trophy.

In 1971 Myers guided the Flying Dutchmen, as the team was known then, to a 12–4 record a number 10 ranking, as well as an at large bid to the first-ever 1971 NCAA tournament.

Hofstra has made seventeen postseason appearances in the NCAA tournament reaching the quarterfinals four times, in 1993, 1999, 2001 and 2006. Hofstra closest effort at making the NCAA final four was in 2006, when they lost in overtime to Massachusetts in the NCAA Quarterfinals, 11–10, after UMass had come back from a 10–5 deficit in the 4th quarter.

The Pride were ranked second in the nation in 2006 and received a number three seed in the NCAA tournament. Coached by current Duke coach John Danowski, Hofstra won 17 straight games losing only their season opener and the quarterfinal match, both to Massachusetts.

Notable athletes and coaches
Jon Cooper
Athan Iannucci
James Metzger
Brett Moyer
Howdy Myers
Doug Shanahan

Season results
The following is a list of Hofstra's results by season as an NCAA Division I program:

{| class="wikitable"

|- align="center"

†NCAA canceled 2020 collegiate activities due to the COVID-19 virus.

References

External links
 

 
1949 establishments in New York (state)
Lacrosse clubs established in 1949
College men's lacrosse teams in the United States